The Parish of Drung gets its name from the townland of the same name. The parish is in the Diocese of Kilmore. The parish is traversed by strategically important roads, most notably the main road between Cootehill and Cavan Town. The landscape of the area is largely that of drumlins and lakes, many of which are now drying up because of improvements in agricultural drainage systems.

Before most of Ireland gained a form of independence as the Irish Free State in December 1922, the parish was dominated for several hundred years by a small number of landowners, notably the Clements family of Rathkenny and the Burrowes family of Stradone House. Before these Anglo-Irish families were granted their estates by the British Crown, the townlands in the parish had been owned by the O'Reilly dynasty, a Gaelic aristocratic family, who lost their land after the 1641 Rebellion.

Civil parishes of County Cavan
Diocese of Kilmore, Elphin and Ardagh
Roman Catholic Diocese of Kilmore